Josef Lux (1 February 1956 in Ústí nad Orlicí – 21 November 1999 in Seattle, Washington) was a leader of the Christian and Democratic Union – Czechoslovak People's Party who entered politics after the Velvet Revolution. He became agriculture minister in 1992 as part of Václav Klaus' First Cabinet. He also served in Josef Tošovský's caretaker government. He had leukemia and died after a bone-marrow transplant.

References 

Recipients of the Order of Tomáš Garrigue Masaryk
KDU-ČSL MPs
Agriculture ministers of the Czech Republic
Mendel University Brno alumni
Deaths from leukemia
1956 births
1999 deaths
People from Ústí nad Orlicí
Leaders of KDU-ČSL
KDU-ČSL Government ministers
Members of the Chamber of Deputies of the Czech Republic (1996–1998)